Deshayes is a surname of French origin.

 André-Jean-Jacques Deshayes (1777–1846), French ballet dancer and choreographer
 Arnouph Deshayes de Cambronne (1768–1846), French governor
 Catherine Deshayes, widow Monvoisin, known as "La Voisin" (c. 1640–1680), a French sorceress
 Émile Deshayes de Marcère (1828–1918), French politician
 Gérard Paul Deshayes (1795–1875), a French geologist and conchologist
 Jean-Baptiste-Henri Deshays or Deshayes  (1729–1765), a French painter
 Karine Deshayes (born 1973), French mezzo-soprano
 Louis Deshayes, Baron de Courmemin (1600–1632), French diplomat
 Prosper-Didier Deshayes (mid 18th century–1815), an opera composer and dancer who lived and worked in France.
 François-Georges Fouques Deshayes, known as Desfontaines or Desfontaines-Lavallée (1733–1825), a French writer and playwright

See also
 Deshaies (surname)
 Jean-Baptiste-Henri Deshays (1729–1765), French painter
 Patrick Deshaye (1912–1964), Canadian lawyer and politician